In topology, a subbase (or subbasis, prebase, prebasis) for a topological space  with topology  is a subcollection  of  that generates  in the sense that  is the smallest topology containing  as open sets. A slightly different definition is used by some authors, and there are other useful equivalent formulations of the definition; these are discussed below.

Definition

The subcollection  generates the topology  This means that  is the smallest topology containing : any topology  on  containing  must also contain 
The collection of open sets consisting of all finite intersections of elements of  together with the set  forms a basis for  This means that every proper open set in  can be written as a union of finite intersections of elements of  Explicitly, given a point  in an open set  there are finitely many sets  of  such that the intersection of these sets contains  and is contained in 

(If we use the nullary intersection convention, then there is no need to include  in the second definition.)

For  subcollection  of the power set  there is a unique topology having  as a subbase. In particular, the intersection of all topologies on  containing  satisfies this condition. In general, however, there is no unique subbasis for a given topology.

Thus, we can start with a fixed topology and find subbases for that topology, and we can also start with an arbitrary subcollection of the power set  and form the topology generated by that subcollection. We can freely use either equivalent definition above; indeed, in many cases, one of the two conditions is more useful than the other.

Alternative definition

Less commonly, a slightly different definition of subbase is given which requires that the subbase  cover   In this case,  is the union of all sets contained in  This means that there can be no confusion regarding the use of nullary intersections in the definition.

However, this definition is not always equivalent to the two definitions above. In other words, there exist topological spaces  with a subset  such that  is the smallest topology containing  yet  does not cover  (such an example is given below). In practice, this is a rare occurrence; e.g. a subbase of a space that has at least two points and satisfies the T1 separation axiom must be a cover of that space.

Examples

The topology generated by any subset  (including by the empty set ) is equal to the trivial topology 

If  is any subset of  then the topology generated by  will be a subset of 

Together, these generate the usual topology, since the intersections  for  generate the usual topology. The second subbase generates the usual topology as well, since the open intervals  with   rational, are a basis for the usual Euclidean topology.

The subbase consisting of all semi-infinite open intervals of the form  alone, where  is a real number, does not generate the usual topology. The resulting topology does not satisfy the T1 separation axiom, since if  every open set containing  also contains 

The initial topology on  defined by a family of functions  where each  has a topology, is the coarsest topology on  such that each  is continuous.

Two important special cases of the initial topology are the product topology, where the family of functions is the set of projections from the product to each factor, and the subspace topology, where the family consists of just one function, the inclusion map.

Suppose that  is a Hausdorff topological space with  containing two or more elements (for example,  with the Euclidean topology). Note that if  is a proper subset of  then  is the smallest topology on  containing  yet  does not cover  (that is, the union  is a proper subset of ).

Results using subbases

One nice fact about subbases is that continuity of a function need only be checked on a subbase of the range.
A net (or sequence)  converges to a point  if and only if every basic neighborhood of  contains all  for sufficiently large

Alexander subbase theorem

The Alexander Subbase Theorem is a significant result concerning subbases that is due to James Waddell Alexander II. The corresponding result for basic (rather than subbasic) open covers is much easier to prove.

Alexander Subbase Theorem: Let  be a topological space.

The converse to this theorem also holds and it is proven by using  (since every topology is a subbasis for itself). 

Suppose for the sake of contradiction that the space  is not compact (so  is an infinite set), yet every subbasic cover from  has a finite subcover. 
Let  denote the set of all open covers of  that do not have any finite subcover of  
Partially order  by subset inclusion and use Zorn's Lemma to find an element  that is a maximal element of  
Observe that:

We will begin by showing that  is  a cover of  
But this contradicts  which proves that  does not cover 

But since  does cover  there also exists some  such that  
Since  is a subbasis generating 's topology, from the definition of the topology generated by  there must exist a finite collection of subbasic open sets  such that

We will now show by contradiction that  for every  

Define

which is a finite subset of  
Observe that for every   is a finite cover of  so let us replace every  with 

Observe that for any subset   covers  if and only if  
In particular, for every  the fact that  covers  implies that  
Since  was arbitrary, we have  
Recalling that  we thus have  which is equivalent to  being a cover of  
Therefore, the original assumption that  is not compact must be wrong, which proves that  is compact. 

Although this proof makes use of Zorn's Lemma, the proof does not need the full strength of choice. 
Instead, it relies on the intermediate Ultrafilter principle.

More generally, Tychonoff's theorem, which states that the product of non-empty compact spaces is compact, has a short proof if the Alexander Subbase Theorem is used.

The product topology on  has, by definition, a subbase consisting of cylinder sets that are the inverse projections of an open set in one factor.  
Given a  family  of the product that does not have a finite subcover, we can partition  into subfamilies that consist of exactly those cylinder sets corresponding to a given factor space.  
By assumption, if  then  does  have a finite subcover.  
Being cylinder sets, this means their projections onto  have no finite subcover, and since each  is compact, we can find a point  that is not covered by the projections of  onto  But then  is not covered by  

Note, that in the last step we implicitly used the axiom of choice (which is actually equivalent to Zorn's lemma) to ensure the existence of

See also

Notes

References

  
  
 
  

Articles containing proofs
General topology